The 1st Crystal Palace Trophy was a Formula Two motor race held on 11 July 1953 at Crystal Palace Circuit, London. The race was run over 15 laps and was won by Tony Rolt in a Connaught Type A-Lea Francis. Roy Salvadori was second in another Connaught, also setting fastest lap, and Les Leston was third in a Cooper T26-JAP.

Results

References 

Crystal Palace Trophy
Crystal Palace Trophy
Crystal Palace Trophy